Myrmecia impaternata is a species of gynogenetic, female-only ant in the genus Myrmecia. Described by Robert Taylor in 2015, the species is endemic to Australia and is common in Canberra and around Armidale. Observations of the species have been confirmed in Queensland.

M. impaternata is a hybrid species, with its origin tracing back to Myrmecia banksi and Myrmecia pilosula.

References

Myrmeciinae
Hymenoptera of Australia
Insects described in 2015
Insects of Australia